Omega Township is located in Marion County, Illinois. As of the 2010 census, its population was 501 and it contained 212 housing units.

Geography 
Omega Township (T3N R4E) is centered at 38°42'N 88°45'W (38.699, -88.756). Forbes Lake (El. 156 m) and Stephen A. Forbes State Park are located mainly at the north end of the township.

Demographics

Adjacent townships 
 Meacham Township (north)
 Oskaloosa Township, Clay County (northeast)
 Songer Township, Clay County (east)
 Xenia Township, Clay County (southeast)
 Iuka Township (south)
 Stevenson Township (southwest)
 Alma Township (west)
 Kinmundy Township (northwest)

References

External links
US Census
City-data.com
Illinois State Archives

Townships in Marion County, Illinois
Townships in Illinois